The New York Times has won many awards. This list is up to date as of April 2018.

Pulitzer Prizes 

The New York Times has been awarded 133 Pulitzer Prizes, more than any other newspaper. They won their first prize in 1918 for complete and accurate coverage of World War I, and their most recent in 2018.

SABEW Best in Business

Peabody Awards

National Magazine Awards

Gerald Loeb Award

Online Journalism Awards

Worth Bingham Prize

Meyer Berger Awards

Maria Moors Cabot Prize

George Polk Awards

Mirror Awards

Alfred I. duPont Awards

Sigma Delta Chi Award

The Hillman Prize

Livingston Awards

Elmer Ferguson Memorial Award

Science in Society Journalism Awards

The Sidney Award

Missouri Lifestyle Journalism Awards 
 1982 General Excellence
 1977 Jane Brody Consumer Writing 
 1977 Richard Severo General Reporting

Notes

References 

The New York Times
Incomplete lists from February 2017
Journalism lists